Tommy Dea (16 December 1908 – 24 May 1986) was an  Australian rules footballer who played with North Melbourne in the Victorian Football League (VFL).

Notes

External links 

1908 births
1986 deaths
Australian rules footballers from Victoria (Australia)
North Melbourne Football Club players
Epping Football Club players